The Cincinnati Kings Indoor Team was an American arena soccer team founded in 2008. Many of the team's initial personnel came from the Cincinnati Excite of the American Indoor Soccer League. The team formed a partnership with the Cincinnati Kings to provide year-round professional soccer in Cincinnati.

The team was a charter member of the Professional Arena Soccer League (PASL).

Current roster

28 November 2010

Year-by-year

Playoff Record

Arenas
 Cincinnati Gardens – 2010–2012
 GameTime Training Center – 2008–2010; 2012–2013

References

External links
 PASL web site

Hamilton County, Ohio
Soccer clubs in Ohio
Kings Indoor Team
Defunct Professional Arena Soccer League teams
Defunct indoor soccer clubs in the United States
Association football clubs established in 2008
Indoor soccer clubs in the United States
2008 establishments in Ohio
Fairfield, Ohio
Association football clubs disestablished in 2013
2013 disestablishments in Ohio